The Los Angeles Chargers are a professional American football team based in the Los Angeles metropolitan area. The Chargers compete in the National Football League (NFL) as a member club of the American Football Conference (AFC) West division. The team plays its home games at SoFi Stadium in Inglewood, California, which it shares with the Los Angeles Rams.

The Chargers were founded in Los Angeles in 1959, and began play in 1960 as a charter member of the American Football League (AFL). They spent their first season in Los Angeles before relocating to San Diego in 1961 to become the San Diego Chargers. The team joined the NFL as a result of the AFL–NFL merger in 1970. In 2017, the Chargers moved back to Los Angeles after 56 seasons in San Diego, a year after the Rams had moved back to the city after spending 21 seasons (1995–2015) in St. Louis. The team previously played at the Los Angeles Memorial Coliseum during their first stint in Los Angeles, Balboa Stadium and San Diego Stadium (also known as Jack Murphy Stadium and Qualcomm Stadium) while in San Diego, and Dignity Health Sports Park (formerly named StubHub Center) from 2017 to 2019, while SoFi Stadium was under construction.

The Chargers won the AFL championship in 1963, and reached the AFL playoffs five times and the AFL Championship game four times before joining the NFL. Since then, the Chargers have made 15 trips to the playoffs and made four appearances in the AFC Championship game. In 1994, the Chargers won their first and only AFC championship, and faced the San Francisco 49ers in Super Bowl XXIX, losing 49–26. The Chargers have eight players and one coach enshrined in the Pro Football Hall of Fame: wide receiver Lance Alworth (1962–1970), defensive end Fred Dean (1975–1981), quarterback Dan Fouts (1973–1987), head coach and general manager Sid Gillman (1960–1969, 1971), wide receiver Charlie Joiner (1976–1986), offensive lineman Ron Mix (1960–1969), tight end Kellen Winslow (1979–1987), linebacker Junior Seau (1990–2002), and running back LaDainian Tomlinson (2001–2009).

Franchise history

Barron Hilton era (1960–1965)

Sid Gillman years (1960–69)

First season in Los Angeles (1960) 
The Chargers were established with seven other American Football League teams in 1959. They began AFL play in Los Angeles the following year in 1960. The Chargers' original owner was hotel heir Barron Hilton, son of Hilton Hotels founder Conrad Hilton. According to the official website of the Pro Football Hall of Fame, Barron Hilton agreed after his general manager, Frank Leahy, picked the Chargers name when he purchased an AFL franchise for Los Angeles: "I liked it because they were yelling ‘charge’ and sounding the bugle at Dodger Stadium and at USC games."

Move to San Diego (1961) 
After the 1960 season, there were rumors that the team was considering moving to San Diego, Atlanta, or Seattle. In January 1961 the team announced that a deal was made with San Diego to play in Balboa Stadium in Balboa Park. 

They played for the whole ten-season existence in the AFL before the upstart league merged with the older NFL. Their only coach for the ten-year life of the AFL was Sid Gillman, a Hall of Famer who was widely recognized as a great offensive innovator. The early AFL years of the San Diego Chargers were highlighted by the outstanding play of wide receiver Lance "Bambi" Alworth with 543 receptions for 10,266 yards in his 11-AFL/NFL-season career. In addition he set the pro football record of consecutive games with a reception (96) during his career.

With players such as Alworth, Paul Lowe, Keith Lincoln and John Hadl, the high-scoring Chargers won divisional crowns five of the league's first six seasons and the AFL title in 1963 with a 51–10 victory over the Boston Patriots. They also played great defense, as indicated by their professional football record 49 pass interceptions in 1961, and featured AFL Rookie of the Year defensive end Earl Faison. The Chargers were the originators of the term "Fearsome Foursome" to describe their all-star defensive line, anchored by Faison and Ernie Ladd.

Eugene Klein era (1966–1983) 
Hilton sold the Chargers to a group headed by Gene Klein and Sam Schulman in August 1966.

In 1970, the Chargers were placed into the AFC West division after the completion of the AFL/NFL merger. But by then, the Chargers fell on hard times; Gillman, who had returned as general manager, stepped down in 1971, and many of the Chargers players from the 1960s had already either retired or had been traded. The Chargers acquired veteran players like Deacon Jones and Johnny Unitas; however, it was at the later stages of their careers and the team struggled, placing third or fourth in the AFC West each year from 1970 to 1978. During the 1973 season, the Chargers were involved in the first major drug scandal in the NFL. That same year, however, a rookie quarterback from Oregon named Dan Fouts would serve as the catalyst to the Chargers' return to prominence as the 1970s wore on.

Don Coryell years (1978–1986) 

The Chargers hired head coach Don Coryell in 1978, who would remain coaching the team until 1986. Coryell developed an offensive scheme and philosophy known as Air Coryell, also known as the "Coryell offense" or the "vertical offense". With Dan Fouts as quarterback, the San Diego Chargers' offense was among the greatest and most exciting passing offenses in NFL history, setting league and individual offensive records. The Chargers led the league in passing yards an NFL record six consecutive years from 1978 to 1983 and again in 1985. They also led the league in total yards in offense 1978–83 and 1985. Under the tutelage of Coryell, Dan Fouts, wide receiver Charlie Joiner, and tight end Kellen Winslow blossomed on the field and would all be inducted into the Pro Football Hall of Fame. The Chargers earned four consecutive playoff appearances (1979–82) during the Air Coryell era, including three AFC West division championships (1979–81). However, they came short of making it to the Super Bowl, including two straight losses in the AFC Championship game in 1980 and 1981.

In 1984, Klein cut salary in preparation of selling the team, sending defensive linemen Johnson and Kelcher to San Francisco, where they would join Dean and offensive tackle Billy Shields for another 49ers championship in Super Bowl XIX.

Spanos family era (1984–present) 
Alex Spanos purchased a majority interest in San Diego from Klein on August 1, 1983. Spanos's family still owns 97% of the team and until his death in 2016, George Pernicano owned the other 3%. Al Saunders was named the seventh head coach in Chargers history in 1986 following the resignation of Coryell during the middle of that season. In , Fouts retired after a 15-year career in which he set seven NFL records and 42 club records, and became the NFL's second most prolific passer of all-time with 43,040 yards. Fouts's jersey number (14) was retired at halftime of "Dan Fouts Day" game in San Diego.

In 1989, Dan Henning, a former Chargers quarterback, Washington Redskins assistant, and Atlanta Falcons head coach, was named the eighth head coach in Chargers history. First-year running back Marion Butts set a club record with 39 carries and a team rookie record with 176 yards in Chargers' 20–13 win in Kansas City. After a three-year stint as Director of Football Operations, Steve Ortmayer was released after the season and replaced by Bobby Beathard.

Bobby Ross years (1992–1996) 
Following Henning's three-season stint with the Chargers, Bobby Ross was hired as the ninth head coach in 1992. Additionally, the Chargers acquired quarterback Stan Humphries in a trade with the Washington Redskins. The Chargers would lose their first four games of the season and come back to become the first 0–4 team to make the playoffs as they won 11 of the last 12 games and clinched the AFC West title. Ross was named NFL Coach of the Year for the Chargers' dramatic turnaround by Pro Football Weekly. In the first round of the playoffs, the Chargers shut out the Chiefs 17–0, but the Dolphins shut out the Chargers in the divisional playoffs to eliminate the Chargers. In 1993, the Chargers finished 8–8 (fourth in their division).

In the 1994 season, the Chargers made their first and, so far, only Super Bowl appearance, against the 49ers in Super Bowl XXIX. They got to the Super Bowl by winning their first six regular season games, the only NFL team to do so in 1994, and finished the season 11–5. Quarterback Stan Humphries and wide receiver Tony Martin combined on a 99-yard touchdown completion to tie an NFL record during a defeat of the Seattle Seahawks, 27–10. They would become the 1994 AFC West Division champions behind a defense led by linebacker Junior Seau, defensive tackles Reuben Davis and Shawn Lee, defensive end Leslie O'Neal and an offense keyed by running back Natrone Means, Humphries and Martin. The Chargers had upset victories over the Dolphins and Steelers in the AFC playoffs. Despite those two close triumphs (22–21 against the Dolphins in the Divisional Round, and 17–13 against the Steelers in the AFC Championship Game), the Chargers lost Super Bowl XXIX to the San Francisco 49ers by a score of 49–26, who were led by quarterback Steve Young (Super Bowl MVP) and wide receiver Jerry Rice.

Despite the lopsided loss in the Super Bowl, Beathard, who traded for or drafted the bulk of the Chargers roster, and who hired coach Ross, was named the NFL's smartest man by Sports Illustrated, and became the only general manager to lead three different teams to the Super Bowl (Chargers, Dolphins, Redskins).

The Chargers' follow-up year in 1995 did not bring the same success of the previous season, but the team still managed to get into the playoffs with a five-game winning streak to end the season at 9–7. However, in the first round, the Chargers were eliminated by the Indianapolis Colts in a 35–20 defeat.

In 1996, running back Rodney Culver and his wife, Karen, were killed in the crash of ValuJet Flight 592 in the Florida Everglades. Culver was the second player in team history to die while on the active roster after David Griggs was killed in a one-car accident in Davie, Florida, 11 months earlier. In 1997, Ross and Beathard were at odds with one another, resulting in Ross and his staff being released. The Chargers selected Kevin Gilbride to become their new head coach. Gilbride, whose coaching background with the Jacksonville Jaguars and Oilers featured a more open passing attack, would mark a major change in offensive style from the ball control ground game of Ross. However, the Chargers struggled in pass protection that year, resulting in Humphries suffering several concussions and his retirement from the game. To replace Humphries, Beathard drafted quarterback Ryan Leaf after the Indianapolis Colts selected Peyton Manning with the first pick in the 1998 NFL Draft. The Chargers traded several players and draft choices to the Arizona Cardinals in order to move up to the second pick and select Leaf. In 1998, the Chargers went 5–11. Said safety Rodney Harrison, "If I had to go through another year like that, I'd probably quit playing."

Gilbride was replaced by interim head coach June Jones, who was on the Chargers' staff before the hire. Jones left the team at the end of the season to coach at the University of Hawaii and the Chargers named former Oregon State University head coach Mike Riley as their new head coach. Leaf wound up having a disappointing career with the Chargers due to poor play and frequent conflict with both Chargers management as well as the press and his teammates, causing his release after the 2000 season. He has been arguably the biggest draft bust in NFL history, and his failure to be the player the team envisioned was seen as a black mark on the franchise. Quarterback Jim Harbaugh, who was acquired in a trade with the Baltimore Ravens for a conditional draft choice in 2000, became the Chargers starting quarterback. Beathard retired in April 2000 and was replaced in January 2001 by John Butler, former general manager of the Bills.

In 2001, Norv Turner, the former head coach of the Redskins, was named offensive coordinator by Riley. Turner installed the offense that he coached with the Dallas Cowboys under Jimmy Johnson. Turner learned the offense from Ernie Zampese, former offensive coordinator during the Coryell era, while the two were on the Los Angeles Rams coaching staff. The Chargers signed Heisman Trophy winner free agent quarterback Doug Flutie, formerly with the Bills, and traded the team's first overall selection in the 2001 NFL Draft to the Atlanta Falcons for their first-round selection (5th overall) and third-round selection in the same draft. In addition the Chargers obtained wide receiver-kick returner Tim Dwight and the Falcons' second-round draft selection in the 2002 NFL Draft. The Chargers used that selection in the 2001 draft to select Texas Christian University running back LaDainian Tomlinson and their own first pick in the second round to select Purdue University quarterback Drew Brees.

Marty Schottenheimer years (2002–2006) 

Hired as a replacement to Riley, Marty Schottenheimer's Chargers squad opened the 2002 season with four straight victories, making him the only coach in team history to win his first four games.
Butler would succumb to cancer after a nine-month struggle in April 2003. Replacing Butler was A. J. Smith, who was named Executive Vice President-General Manager, replacing his close friend. Smith and Butler had worked together with the Bills, playing key roles with Buffalo's Super Bowl teams. In 2003, the Chargers traded Seau to the Dolphins for a draft pick in 2004 NFL Draft. Seau was selected to the 2003 Pro Bowl, his 12th Pro Bowl selection of his career, and in his final season with the Chargers, he was chosen by teammates as the recipient of the Emil Karas Award as the team's Most Inspirational Player. Also in 2003, Tomlinson accumulated 195 total yards from scrimmage in a late-season game against the Packers to raise his season total to 2,011 and became the first player in team history and the eighth player in NFL history to record consecutive 2,000-yard seasons. Tomlinson also became the first player in NFL history to rush for 1,000 yards and catch 100 passes in the same season.

The Chargers coveted Eli Manning and wanted to select him with their first round pick, which was also the first overall pick of the draft. However, after Manning indicated before the draft that he would not sign with the San Diego Chargers, they were forced to adjust their plans. Philip Rivers was their first alternative to Manning because the Chargers head coach at the time, Marty Schottenheimer, had coached Rivers at the Senior Bowl and he liked what he saw from Rivers. The Chargers agreed to a trade on draft day with the New York Giants. Manning was selected by the San Diego Chargers then later in the draft traded for Rivers, selected with the fourth pick by the Giants. The Chargers also received draft picks from the Giants that were used to select future Pro Bowlers Shawne Merriman and Nate Kaeding. Rivers was one of 17 quarterbacks taken in the 2004 NFL Draft along with Ben Roethlisberger, Eli Manning, and Matt Schaub. Rivers, Roethlisberger, Schaub and Manning have been voted to the Pro Bowl since becoming starters; none had produced a season with a losing record until Schaub in 2010, but Roethlisberger and Manning both have won two Super Bowls. They have been compared favorably to the Quarterback class of 1983, which included Hall of Fame quarterbacks John Elway (1st pick), Jim Kelly (14th), and Dan Marino (27th).

In August 2004, Rivers signed a six-year, $40.5 million contract that included $14.5 million in signing bonuses. However, due to a protracted contract negotiation, Rivers only reported to the team during the last week of training camp, and incumbent Drew Brees retained his starting job. After the starting quarterback switch, it was almost certain that Brees' days as the Chargers' starting QB were over. However, Rivers held out nearly all of training camp, and Brees remained the starter throughout the 2004 season, where he started 15 games and led the team to a 12–4 regular season record. Brees posted spectacular numbers, completing 65.5% of his passes for 3,159 yards, with 27 touchdowns to only 7 interceptions, giving him a 104.8 passer rating. The Chargers won the AFC West and Brees was selected to the 2004 Pro Bowl. He was named 2004 NFL Comeback Player of the Year.

Marty Schottenheimer was named NFL Coach of the Year for the 2004 NFL season. He led the team to a playoff appearance, his 12th as a head coach. However, it resulted in a disappointing loss to the underdog New York Jets in overtime in 2005.

During the 2005 NFL Draft, the Chargers tried to get some key rookies that would help carry the momentum from their mostly successful 2004–2005 run. They used their first pick on LB Shawne "Lights Out" Merriman from the University of Maryland. Then, they used their next pick on DT Luis Castillo from Northwestern University. Their other choices were WR Vincent Jackson from Northern Colorado, RB Darren Sproles from Kansas State, OT Wesley Britt from University of Alabama, OT Wes Sims from Oklahoma University, and Center Scott Mruczkowski from Bowling Green State.

The Chargers got off to a rough start in their 2005 campaign, losing a close one to the Dallas Cowboys in their Week 1 home opener (28–24) and then they lost on the road to their AFC West rival, the Denver Broncos (20–17). It was not until a Week 3 home game on Sunday night that they got their first win of the season, when Manning and the New York Giants got "shocked to the system" as LaDainian Tomlinson had one of the greatest games of his career. He got 220 total yards, had 3 rushing touchdowns, and threw for a touchdown as he helped the Chargers win 45–23.

A week later, they were able to build off their win by not only beating the two-time defending champion New England Patriots 41–17, but also ending the Pats' 21-game winning streak at home. In their Week 5 Monday Night home game against the Pittsburgh Steelers, the Chargers wore their throwback uniforms during this season (they had also worn them during the 1994 season). The Steelers held on to win with a 40-yard field goal by Jeff Reed (24–22). The Chargers rebounded on the road against their division rival Oakland Raiders (27–14). In their Week 7 road trip to Philadelphia, they hoped to build off their win against the Eagles. Late in the game, with the Chargers leading 17–13, the Chargers tried to go for a field goal to put their lead well out of reach, but it got blocked and Eagles DB Matt Ware returned it 65 yards for the game-winning touchdown and the Chargers fourth loss of the season.

After going 3–4, the Chargers turned things around as they began a five-game winning streak. They won at home against division rival Kansas City Chiefs (28–20) and on the road against the New York Jets (31–26). Coming off their Week 10 bye, they went home and wore their throwback uniforms again. This time, it was a dominating performance as the Chargers manhandled the Buffalo Bills, 48–10. Then, they went on the road and won a close match against the Washington Redskins (23–17) in overtime and then they swept the Oakland Raiders at home by a score of 34–10.

The Chargers were 8–5, coming off a 23–21 loss to the Miami Dolphins. On December 18, the Chargers beat the undefeated Indianapolis Colts 26–17, snapping a 13–0 winning streak. However, despite a record of 9–6, they were officially eliminated from AFC playoff contention in 2005 after a 20–7 loss to the Kansas City Chiefs the following Saturday. The Chargers lost their final game of the season by a score of 23–7 to the AFC West champion Denver Broncos to finish with a record of 9–7.
The Chargers delivered an impressive performance in 2006, losing only to the Ravens and Chiefs; they finished 14–2 which secured them the #1 AFC seed in the playoffs. However, they lost 24–21 to the New England Patriots in the divisional round.

Norv Turner years (2007–2012) 
Following the 2006 season, they replaced Schottenheimer with new head coach Norv Turner. In 2007, they went 11–5, beating the Tennessee Titans and the defending champion Indianapolis Colts to reach the AFC title game. However, they fell to the Patriots for the second year in a row. In 2008, the Chargers dropped to 8–8, but as the AFC West was unusually weak that year, they still managed to win the division title. Defeating the Colts in the wild card round, they lost to the Pittsburgh Steelers in the divisional round.

San Diego began the 2009 season 2–3. After losing to the Broncos on Monday night, they began an unbroken winning streak for the rest of the season, which included defeating the entire NFC East. In Week 11, they avenged their earlier loss against the Broncos by inflicting a 32–3 rout on them. The next game saw them beat a 1–11 Cleveland Browns squad 30–23, in which LaDainian Tomlinson broke Hall of Famer Jim Brown's rushing record and was congratulated by him afterwards. The Chargers secured another division title, the #2 AFC seed, and looked to be a near shoo-in for the Super Bowl. However, the team's postseason futility continued. Hosting the New York Jets on January 17, 2010, they endured an upset defeat, where, despite an early lead, were unable to overcome the strong Jets' defense. Kicker Nate Kaeding also missed three field goal and PAT attempts, which resulted in the Chargers losing 17–14.

The 2010 season was the 1st season without LaDainian Tomlinson since 2000 (Tomlinson was let go by management due to an oversized contract relative to production and other issues; he went on to lead the Jets in rushing with 914 yards & tied for 3rd in receptions with 52). The 2010 campaign started off slowly again, this time 2–5 (including losses to some of the worst teams in football at the time – the Kansas City Chiefs, the Oakland Raiders, the Seattle Seahawks and the St. Louis Rams). The losses were due to turnovers & mental mistakes by young players on special teams allowing blocked punts & kick/punt return touchdowns. The loss to Oakland ended their 13-game winning streak against the Raiders since their last loss on September 28, 2003. The Chargers then went on another second half run with four straight wins but this time instead of keeping the streak going the entire second half they had a big let down losing at home to the Raiders again, this time 28–13 (ending their shared NFL record, with the Dolphins, of 18 straight wins in December). Despite the loss, they still had a chance to win their 5th straight AFC West title, tying the Raiders, but they had another bad loss at the Bengals 34–20 ending their chances. The Chargers beat Denver to end the season with a 9–7 record & out of the playoffs for the first time since 2005. They finished the season as the 8th team in NFL history to rank #1 in overall offense (395.6 yards/game), and overall defense (271.6 yards/game), and became only the 2nd of those teams to not make the playoffs (1953 Eagles 7–4–1). They were second to the Colts in passing yards per game (282.4), second to the Patriots in points scored per game (27.6), 1st in passing yards allowed per game (177.8), 4th in rushing yards allowed per game (93.8), and tied for 2nd in sacks (47). On the negative stat sheet, they gave up the most punt return yards per game (18.9) & had 29 turnovers. Philip Rivers had another great season with a career-high 4,710 yards (#1 in the NFL), 294 yards passing per game (tied for 1st with Manning), 66% completion pct. (third to Brees & Manning), 30 TD's, only 13 INT's & a 101.8 passer rating (second to Brady). Mike Tolbert 11 rushing TD's & Antonio Gates 10 receiving TD's were among the league leaders in TD's scored. On defense, Shaun Phillips' 11 sacks were in the top 10.

With the special teams failure of the 2010 season campaign, the Chargers hoped to rebound with a strong performance to start the season, and a way to overcome slow starts.

The Chargers started off the 2011 season with a 4–1 campaign, with their only loss to the New England Patriots. From that point on, however, the Chargers began a six-game skid with losses to the Jets, Chiefs, Packers, Raiders, Bears, and Broncos, with the first four by only a score and against Denver in overtime. Injuries to both the offensive and the defensive line hit the Chargers hard. But finally on December 5, 2011, the Chargers got their first win in over a month against the Jacksonville Jaguars, beating the also-struggling team. 
The Chargers then began a three-game winning streak most notably beating the Ravens by more than any team has beat them that season.
However, the Chargers were beaten, 38–10, by the Detroit Lions to drop their record to 7–8 and eliminate the possibility of being in the playoffs. After a 38–26 victory over the Raiders in week 17, the Chargers finished at 8–8 and in a numerical tie for first place in the AFC West along with Oakland and Denver. However, the Chargers were beaten out by Denver for the Division Title via tie-breaker. After missing the playoffs for the third straight season in 2012, the Chargers fired general manager Smith and head coach Turner.

Mike McCoy years (2013–2016) 
On January 9, 2013, the Chargers announced that Tom Telesco, former Vice President of Football Operations with the Indianapolis Colts, would take over as General Manager following the firing of A. J. Smith. Additionally, the organization promoted John Spanos to President of Football Operations. On January 15, 2013, Broncos offensive coordinator, Mike McCoy, was hired as the new head coach and Ken Whisenhunt as offensive coordinator.

The Chargers finished the 2013 season 9–7 and made the playoffs for the first time since 2009. They entered the playoffs as the sixth seed. On January 5, 2014, the Chargers defeated the Cincinnati Bengals at Paul Brown Stadium (27–10) to advance to the AFC Divisional Playoff Round. The Chargers then lost to the Denver Broncos at Sports Authority Field at Mile High the following Sunday, January 12, 2014 (24–17).

After starting the season strongly, including a five-win run in September and October, the Chargers were beset by a string of injuries to key players, and eventually finished the season at 9–7. In contrast to 2013, the record was not enough to make the playoffs. The Chargers began the season 5–1, winning five straight after losing their season opener. It was followed by a three-game losing streak, and they finished 4–4 in the second half. They won just two of their final five games, coming back from double-digit fourth quarter deficits twice to remain in playoff contention. They lost the final game of the season when a win would have secured a playoff berth. In three of their last four games, and five of their last eight, the Chargers did not score more than one touchdown. Compared to 2013, the offense dropped in points (from 12th in the league to 17th), yards (5th to 18th), first downs (3rd to 15th), net yards per pass (2nd to 8th), rushing yards (13th to 30) and yards per rush (21st to 31st). It was the second time in three years the team finished second-to-last in yards per carry. San Diego was just 2–4 against teams in their division in the AFC West, and were swept by both the Denver Broncos and the Kansas City Chiefs. It was their worst intradivision record since they were 1–5 in 2003. The Chargers were only 3–6 against teams with winning records. They matched their 9–7 record from 2013, but missed the playoffs for the fourth time in five seasons.

During the season, the Chargers, the St. Louis Rams, and the Oakland Raiders all intimated they might apply to move to Los Angeles at the end of the season. The Chargers announced in December 2014 that they would not be seeking to move for the 2015 season, followed by an announcement from the NFL that no team would move to L.A. until the 2016 season at the earliest.

Controversy filled the 2015 off-season, as attorney and team spokesperson Mark Fabiani continually bashed the local San Diego city government's efforts to negotiate a replacement for Qualcomm Stadium. When St. Louis Rams owner Stan Kroenke announced in January 2015 his intention to build a new stadium in Inglewood, the Chargers felt pressured to announce their own Los Angeles plan to preserve what they claimed was "25 percent of their fan base" in the affluent Los Angeles and Orange County areas. In February 2015, the team announced a stadium proposal in Carson, in partnership with the Oakland Raiders, their AFC West divisional rivals. In August 2015, San Diego city officials announced their new plan for a new $1.1 billion Chargers stadium at the Mission Valley site of the existing stadium, which included a $350 million contribution of public funds without raising taxes, but Chargers officials scoffed at the proposal and refused to negotiate with the city on any proposal that was not located at the team's preferred downtown location.

The 2015 season started off with a win against the Detroit Lions at home. The Chargers lost to the Cincinnati Bengals and Minnesota Vikings on the road before defeating the Cleveland Browns on a last second field goal. Following their 2–2 start, the Chargers lost their next six games, dropping to 2–8. In their six straight losses, they lost heartbreakers to the Pittsburgh Steelers, Green Bay Packers, Baltimore Ravens and the Chicago Bears, as well as sound defeats by both, division rivals, the Oakland Raiders and the Kansas City Chiefs. They finally broke their losing streak by defeating the Jacksonville Jaguars on the road, bringing their record to 3–8, in last place in the AFC West and 3rd worst in the American Football Conference (one game ahead of both the Browns and the Tennessee Titans). They are also tied for the third worst record in the National Football League. They then proceeded to beat the Miami Dolphins in Week 14 winning 30–14. They finished the season 4–12.

The day following the conclusion of the  regular season, the Chargers, Rams, and Raiders all filed to move to Los Angeles. On January 12, 2016, the NFL owners voted 30–2 to allow the Rams to return to Los Angeles and approved the Inglewood stadium project over the Carson project. The Chargers were given a one-year approval to move, conditioned on negotiating a lease agreement with the Rams or an agreement to work with the Rams to build the new stadium.

On January 14, 2016, the team applied to trademark the term "Los Angeles Chargers" for the purposes of running and marketing a professional football franchise. After two weeks of negotiation, the Chargers and Rams on January 29, 2016, reached an agreement-in-principle to share the planned SoFi Stadium. Both teams would contribute a $200 million stadium loan from the NFL and personal seat license fees to the construction costs and would pay $1 per year in rent to the facility's controlling entity, StadCo LA, LLC.

Meanwhile, in San Diego, the Chargers had continued preliminary work on a ballot initiative for public approval on a new facility at the controversial downtown location, while refusing to negotiate with the City of San Diego on its proposed new Mission Valley stadium, which was the location strongly preferred by its local stadium task force. On November 8, 2016, Measure C, which required a two-thirds majority to use public hotel tax funds towards the proposed downtown stadium's construction was voted down (57% opposed over 43% in support). In December 2016, the San Diego City Council extended an offer for the Chargers to lease the 166-acre Mission Valley property for $1 per year for 99 years. On December 14, 2016, at an owners' meeting, the terms of the Chargers and Rams lease agreement, as well as the team's debt ceiling were approved thus taking the first steps for a possible move to Los Angeles in 2017. Around this time, the Raiders announced that they would move to Las Vegas, instead of Los Angeles, effective in 2020.

Return to Los Angeles 

Chargers owner Dean Spanos announced the move in a letter to the city of San Diego posted to the team's official site on January 12, 2017. The team, which would pay the NFL a $645 million relocation fee announced it would be returning to their birthplace in Los Angeles starting with the 2017 season at Dignity Health Sports Park (then known as StubHub Center) in Carson, despite the stadium's 30,000 seating capacity being well below the 50,000 minimum that the NFL set for temporary homes. The home of Major League Soccer's LA Galaxy served as the Chargers' temporary home field until they joined the Rams at SoFi Stadium in Inglewood starting with the 2020 NFL season. The Chargers became the second former San Diego professional sports franchise to move to Los Angeles, after the Clippers in 1984.

The move drew some controversy. Los Angeles Times columnist Bill Plaschke welcomed the team to town by writing "We. Don't. Want. You.", noting that "The Chargers aren't even the second team in town behind the Rams. The Chargers aren't even the third team of interest here behind the Rams and Raiders. The Chargers might not even be in the top-five favorite NFL teams in Los Angeles." At a game at the Staples Center between the Los Angeles Clippers and Lakers, the Chargers' logo was shown on a scoreboard and was "booed heartily". Chargers tight end Jeff Cumberland was also "jeered" by the crowd when featured on the big screen.

One week after the move from San Diego to Los Angeles was announced, ESPN's Adam Schefter reported that the other NFL owners were "angered" by the decision, and that "the NFL wants the Chargers to move back, though nobody believes that possibility is realistic."

Anthony Lynn years (2017–2020) 
On January 13, the Chargers fired defensive coordinator John Pagano. It took the team one week to find a replacement for Pagano, as they hired Gus Bradley on January 20. Bradley was formerly the head coach for the Jacksonville Jaguars, and before landing that head coaching job was the defensive coordinator for the Seattle Seahawks. The Chargers also announced they had hired Anthony Lynn to be their next head coach.

In their first game back in Los Angeles at StubHub Center included an announced attendance was just over 25,000, divided "around 50/50" between fans of the Chargers and the visiting Miami Dolphins. After the poor response, the NFL was reportedly considering ways to move the Chargers back to San Diego, although that possibility was considered unlikely. The league officially denied that such discussions were happening, as San Diego was stated not to have a usable stadium and that the Spanos family refuses to consider going back to the city; the league did acknowledge that a vote of the owners could change the situation. The team had a 9–7 record, but missed the playoffs for the fourth consecutive time.

After a 12–4 regular season record, the Chargers qualified for the 2018 playoffs. The team defeated the Baltimore Ravens in the Wild Card round, but lost to the eventual Super Bowl champion New England Patriots in the Divisional round. However, Chargers' attendance problems continued into their second season. For instance, there were so many fans of the visiting Kansas City Chiefs at the Chargers' 2018 home opener that USA Today remarked it "was essentially a Chiefs home game". In December 2018, a Los Angeles Times columnist asked if the Chargers would receive a parade in the city if they were to win the Super Bowl.

The team's struggles to draw fans reportedly led them to lower their initial revenue goal when they moved into the new stadium from $400 million to $150 million, and caused some owners to doubt the Chargers' viability in Los Angeles. Beyond low attendance, the Chargers receive only 18.75% of season ticket revenues through 2040, contributing to the reduced goal.

In the 2019 season, the Chargers had a poor 5–11 record, and were swept by their division.

On September 13, 2020, Tyrod Taylor became the starting quarterback for the Chargers and the first new quarterback to start since Philip Rivers' starting debut on December 31, 2005. He led them to win 16-13 due to a missed field goal by the Bengals. On September 20, 2020, Taylor suffered a punctured lung while receiving a pain-killing injection, forcing rookie quarterback Justin Herbert to start. Herbert led the team to a narrow loss against the Chiefs, 23–20, in his first start. In week 13, the Chargers lost to the Patriots, 45–0, in the worst blowout loss in team history. The season concluded in a 38–21 win over the Chiefs. Justin Herbert broke multiple rookie records throughout the season, but despite his record-breaking season, the Chargers finished the season with a 7–9 record. At the conclusion of the 2020 season, the organization announced that Lynn was fired as head coach.

Brandon Staley years (2021–present)

The Chargers signed Rams defensive coordinator Brandon Staley to become their new head coach on January 17, 2021. Brandon Staley brought in Saints quarterbacks coach Joe Lombardi, grandson of Vince Lombardi, as the new offensive coordinator, and Renaldo Hill, Broncos defensive backs coach, as their new defensive coordinator.

In the 2021 season, the Chargers' record improved to 9–8 (with an extra 17th game added to the NFL regular season). Herbert broke numerous sophomore year records, but despite his and the rest of the team's efforts, the Chargers missed the playoffs in a week 18 win-or-tie-or-go home overtime loss to the Raiders. 

On February 3, 2022, the Chargers hired Vikings special teams coordinator Ryan Ficken. In 2022, the Chargers announced the location of a new headquarters in El Segundo, California. The Chargers finished the 2022 NFL Season with a 10-7 record and the 5th seed in the AFC. They lost in the Wild Card round of the playoffs to the Jacksonville Jaguars.

On January 17, 2023, the Chargers fired Offensive Coordinator Joe Lombardi and Quarterbacks Coach Shane Day. The Chargers hired former Cowboys Offensive Coordinator Kellen Moore to be their new Offensive Coordinator on January 31. Chargers Defensive Coordinator Renaldo Hill unexpectedly left the team on February 20 to join the Miami Dolphins as their secondary coach and passing game coordinator, with the vacancy being filled by the Chargers defensive backs coach Derrick Ansley on the same day.

Logos and uniforms

Except for color changes along the way, the Chargers have essentially used the logo of an arc-shaped lightning bolt since the team debuted in 1960. During its period in the AFL, the club also used a shield logo that featured a horsehead, a lightning bolt, and the word "Chargers". The team brought the logo back for on-field design in the 2018 season.

From 1960 to 1973, the colors consisted of various shades of Electric blue ("powder" blue, but technically called Collegiate blue) or white jerseys, both with gold lightning bolts on the shoulders. The helmets were white and had both the arc-shaped lightning bolt logo, in gold or navy depending on the year, and the player's number. At first, the team wore white pants before switching to gold in 1966. In 1973, the numerals on the blue jerseys changed from white to gold.

In 1974, the sky blue was changed to dark royal blue. The helmet was also changed to dark blue and the players' numbers were removed. Additionally, the face masks became yellow, thus making them one of the first teams in the NFL (with the Kansas City Chiefs) to use a facemask color other than the then-predominant grey. From 1978 through 1983, the Chargers wore their white jerseys at home, coinciding with the hiring of coach Don Coryell – when Joe Gibbs, a Coryell assistant in 1979–80, became head coach of the Washington Redskins in 1981, he did the same, and white at home became a Redskins staple through 2007 – but Coryell switched the Chargers to their blue jerseys at home starting in 1984. With the exception of the 1991 season and other sporadic home games since, San Diego wears its blue jerseys at home.

In 1985, the Chargers started using navy blue jerseys and returned to wearing white pants. The team's uniform design was next revamped in 1988. It featured an even darker shade of navy blue. The lightning bolts on the jerseys and helmets were white, with navy interior trim and gold outlining; the facemasks became navy blue. In 1990, the team started to wear navy pants with their white jerseys. From 1988 to 1991, the team displayed stripes down the pants rather than lightning bolts. The Chargers went with all-white combinations in 1997 and 2001, only to have the blue pants make a comeback. On October 27, 2003, the Chargers wore their navy pants with their navy jersey for a Monday Night Football game versus the Miami Dolphins that was played at Sun Devil Stadium, then the home of the Arizona Cardinals, due to wildfires in southern California. This was the only game in which the Chargers had worn the all-dark combination until the uniform change in 2020.|

From the late 1980s to 2000, the Chargers wore white at home during some preseason games and dark for regular season games. In 2001, the Chargers started wearing their dark uniforms for preseason games and white uniforms in September home games due to the heat before switching back to dark in October.

In March 2007, the Chargers unveiled their first uniform redesign since 1988, on the team's official website. The team formally unveiled this new uniform set, which mixes old and new styles, in a private team-only event. Navy blue remains the primary color on the home jersey, but the familiar lightning bolt was reverted to gold, and now has navy outlining and powder blue interior trim. The latter color is a nod to the 1960s uniforms. The redesigned lightning bolt was moved to the sides of the shoulders from the top, and includes a new numbering font and word mark in white, with gold outlining and powder blue interior trim. The pants also have a redesigned lightning bolt in gold, with powder blue trim on a navy stripe. Additionally, the team pays tribute to other uniform features from their history by wearing a metallic white helmet, with a navy face mask, the newly revamped bolt in gold with navy and powder blue trim, and white pants. The road white jerseys with navy pants, as well as the alternate powder blue jerseys with white pants, were also redesigned with the new scheme.

From 2002 to 2006, the Chargers used the early-1960s powder blue uniforms as alternate jerseys, which many football fans (both of the Chargers and of other teams) clamored for the team to bring back full-time.

Since 2007, the Chargers have worn the alternate powder blue jerseys twice per season. The alternate powder blue jerseys have also been worn in a playoff game against the Indianapolis Colts in 2008.

In 2009, in honor of their 50th anniversary as one of the eight original AFL teams, the Chargers wore their 1963 throwback uniforms for three games.

For the 2013 season, the Chargers made minor tweaks to their current uniforms. These include a two-tone nameplate (gold with powder blue trim on home jersey, navy with gold trim on away jersey, and white with navy trim on alternate jersey), collars matching the color of the jersey, and the addition of a gold stripe on the socks.

On January 12, 2017, with the announcement that the Chargers were moving to Los Angeles, the team unveiled a new alternate logo incorporating the letters "LA" with a lightning bolt. The logo was immediately and widely ridiculed by fans, the media, and even other professional sports franchises, in part for its resemblance to the Los Angeles Dodgers logo. The team tried to defuse the controversy by changing the color scheme of the new logo before scrapping it altogether after two days.

The team officially announced on April 16, 2019, that it would wear its powder blue jerseys, the same uniforms they wore during their inaugural season in 1960 while in Los Angeles, as its primary home uniform beginning with the 2019 NFL season. The club also announced that the facemask color would change from navy blue to gold, which was previously worn when the team wore its royal blue NFL Color Rush uniforms.

On March 24, 2020, the team announced new logos and upcoming new uniforms for the team. The new logos removed the navy blue completely, altered the double bolt lessening the curve, and debuted a new script logo featuring powder blue and gold and lightning bolt shooting from the A in Chargers. On April 21, 2020, the team unveiled their new uniforms. This uniform set has numbers on the helmet and includes two color-rush uniforms, a royal blue set similar to the one used in their previous look, and an all-navy set, which has color of the logo on the helmet changed to navy as well. Gold pants were also included in the rebrand. Powder blue also returned as the primary color.

Rivalries

Las Vegas Raiders 

The Chargers–Raiders rivalry dates to the 1963 season, when the Raiders defeated the heavily favored Chargers twice, both come-from-behind fourth quarter victories. One of the most memorable games between these teams was the "Holy Roller" game in 1978, in which the Raiders intentionally fumbled in order to score a touchdown. This somewhat controversial play resulted in a rule change the following season. On November 22, 1982, the Raiders hosted their first Monday Night football game in Los Angeles against the Chargers. The Chargers led the game in the 1st half 24–0 until the Raiders scored 28 unanswered points in the second half to win 28–24. On January 10, 2022, the Raiders defeated the Chargers in overtime, 35-32. The winning field goal was unnecessary for the Raiders' playoff chances, and if the game had ended in a tie, both teams would have made the playoffs. With the field goal, the Chargers were eliminated. The Raiders lead the series 67–57–2 as of the end of the 2022 season, including having won the only playoff game between the two teams, the 1980 AFC Championship game.

Los Angeles Rams 
Initially, the Los Angeles Raiders and Rams were considered to be competing in the "Battle of Los Angeles" during the Raiders' tenure in Los Angeles from 1982-94. However, the rivalry ended as the Rams moved to St. Louis and the Raiders returned to Oakland in the mid-1990s. The Raiders unsuccessfully attempted to move back to Los Angeles in 2015 following a failed joint stadium project with the then-San Diego Chargers. The intercity rivalry was revived only with the Chargers' move from San Diego in 2017, following the Rams' return to Los Angeles in 2016. Hostility erupted between the two clubs during a 2017 joint scrimmage at the Rams' training camp in Irvine, California. Rams cornerback Nickell Robey-Coleman and Chargers receiver Keenan Allen initiated an altercation and multiple players rushed into the skirmish, creating an uproar from the crowd. Following the hiring of coach Sean McVay in 2017, the Rams managed to win back-to-back division titles, including an appearance in Super Bowl LIII during McVay's second season as head coach. The Chargers experienced their own playoff success by boasting a 12-4 record in 2018 and making an appearance in the 2018 AFC divisional round but lost to the New England Patriots. The Rams lead the only regular-season matchup in Los Angeles thus far.

Kansas City Chiefs 

Chiefs lead 66–58–1 as of the end of the 2022 season, but the Chargers won the only playoff meeting between the two teams, a 1992 AFC wild card game.

Denver Broncos 

Broncos lead 70–54–1 as of the end of the 2022 season, including having won the only playoff meeting between the two teams, a 2013 AFC Divisional game.

Season-by-season record

The table below shows the five most recent NFL regular season records along with their respective finish in the NFL playoffs. The Los Angeles Chargers appeared in the postseason in one of the five last seasons, which happened in 2018 that resulted in a Divisional loss to the Patriots. Recent notable honors with current members of the Los Angeles Chargers include NFL Rookie of the Year in 2016 for Joey Bosa (Defensive) and in 2020 for Justin Herbert (Offensive) along with NFL Comeback Player of the Year for Keenan Allen in 2017.

Note: GP = Games played, W = Wins, L = Losses, W–L% = Winning percentage

Players of note

Current roster

Retired numbers

The Chargers currently have four retired numbers: #14 (Dan Fouts), #19 (Lance Alworth), #21 (LaDainian Tomlinson) and #55 (Junior Seau). As of 2010, the Chargers' policy was to have the Chargers Hall of Fame committee evaluate candidates for a player's number to retire after the player has retired from the league after five years, Seau was the only exception to this policy. The committee consists of Chargers Executive Vice President Alex Spanos, Chargers public relations director Bill Johnston, San Diego Hall of Champions founder Bob Breitbard, and the presidents of the San Diego Sports Commission and the Chargers Backers Fan Club. There are few recognized guidelines in sports regarding retiring numbers, and the NFL has no specific league policy. "You have to have enough numbers for players to wear", said NFL spokesman Greg Aiello. The Chargers have rarely retired numbers. The San Diego Union-Tribune wrote, "The [Chargers] tend to honor their heritage haphazardly."

Pro Football Hall of Famers

Chargers Hall of Fame

The Chargers created their Hall of Fame in 1976. The members of the Hall of Fame are honored at the Chargers Ring of Honor, founded in 2000 and viewable above the visiting team's sideline of Qualcomm Stadium on the press level. Eligible candidates must have been retired for at least four seasons. Selections are made by a five-member committee chaired by Dean Spanos, Chargers vice-chairman. , other committee members included Bob Breitbard, founder of the San Diego Hall of Champions; Ron Fowler, president of the Greater San Diego Sports Association; Jane Rappoport, president of the Charger Backers; and Bill Johnston, the team's director of public relations. The Chargers in 2012 allowed fans to vote for the newest member.

50th Anniversary Team

The Chargers announced their 50th Anniversary Team in 2009 to honor the top players and coaches in the team's history. The Chargers were founded in 1959. The team included 53 players and coaches selected from 103 nominees. The Chargers originally stated that only 50 members would be selected. Online voting by fans accounted for 50% of the voting results; votes from Chargers Hall of Famers and five members of the local media made up for the other 50%. Over 400,000 votes were cast online. Dan Fouts and LaDainian Tomlinson received the first and second most votes, respectively. The team features 7 Pro Football Hall of Fame members and 11 players that were active on the 2009 Chargers team.

San Diego Hall of Champions
Alworth, Mix, Hadl, Joiner, Coryell, Gillman, Garrison, Fouts, White, Winslow, Faison, Benirschke, Lincoln, Washington, Humphries, Ladd and Wilkerson are also members of the San Diego Hall of Champions, which is open to athletes from the San Diego area as well as those who played for San Diego-based professional and collegiate teams.

Staff

Head coaches

Current staff

Radio and television

The Chargers' flagship radio station is KYSR-FM Alt 98.7 in Los Angeles, with daily coverage and special programming on KLAC-AM 570 LA Sports Play-by-play voice Matt "Money" Smith & NFL Network analyst  Daniel Jeremiah comprise the broadcast team.  KYSR-FM's iHeartMedia Los Angeles sister-station KFI AM 640 served as the previous flagship station for the team since the Chargers’ return to Los Angeles from 2017 to 2019.  Past Chargers radio broadcasters have included Josh Lewin, Ralph Lawler, Stu Nahan, Tom Kelly, Lee "Hacksaw" Hamilton, Dan Rowe, Ted Leitner, and Hank Bauer. Bauer served seventeen seasons (1998–2014) as the radio color analyst; however, the Chargers and then-flagship KIOZ decided not to renew his contract, and was replaced by Conway starting with the 2015 season. As of 2014, the Chargers also stream their radio broadcasts on their official mobile application (through iOS and Android devices) as well as on their website.

As of the 2020 season, Chargers preseason games will be broadcast by KCBS-TV; likewise, in the former San Diego market, KFMB is the local affiliate. As per the NFL's television deals, KCBS also broadcasts CBS coverage of most Chargers regular season games against AFC teams.

Dennis Packer, the public address announcer of all USC football games at the Los Angeles Memorial Coliseum, serves as the public address announcer of all Chargers home games at SoFi Stadium. Packer replaced legendary P.A. announcer Bruce Binkowski, who went on to become the executive director of the Holiday and Poinsettia Bowl games, which were played at their former home, now-defunct SDCCU Stadium. The Holiday Bowl's being played in 2020 & 2021 at Dignity Health Sports Park and will return to Snapdragon Stadium in 2022. Poinsettia Bowl went defunct in 2016.

With the Chargers' return to Los Angeles in 2017, the team became a beneficiary of league scheduling policies. Both the Chargers and the Los Angeles Rams share the Los Angeles market, which is on the West Coast of the United States. This means that the Chargers cannot play home games, road division games against the Denver Broncos or Las Vegas Raiders, or interconference road games against the NFC West (in seasons that the AFC West and NFC West meet in interconference play) in the early 10:00 a.m. Pacific time slot. In addition, they cannot play interconference home games at the same time or network as the Rams. As a result, both teams generally will have more limited scheduling options, and will also benefit by receiving more prime-time games than usual (click here for further information). Thus, regardless of the previous season's record, the Chargers will receive a disproportionate number of Sunday Night, Monday Night and/or Thursday Night games, compared to the rest of the league. Additionally, if the Chargers and Rams are both playing at the same time on Sunday afternoons on a certain network (for instance, a Rams road game against an AFC opponent at the same time as a Charger home game with an NFC opponent with both on Fox, or the reverse where the Rams are on the road against an AFC opponent and the Chargers are at home against an AFC opponent on CBS), in the Los Angeles market, Fox and CBS have authorization to carry the extra game on their secondary sister stations; Fox games air on KCOP-TV, while CBS games are aired on KCAL-TV. In 2020, the Chargers signed a multi-year preseason TV deal with KCBS-TV and KCAL-TV and will have a weekly show with the latest team news, replacing KABC-TV after three seasons (2017, 2018 and 2019) of televising Chargers preseason football.

Radio affiliates

English stations

California

Spanish stations

California

Mexico

Theme song

The Chargers' fight song, "San Diego Super Chargers", was recorded in 1979 at the height of the team's success with Air Coryell, and has a distinctly disco sound. The team under then-new owner Alex Spanos replaced the song in 1989 with a non-disco cover version, but the original version was revived in 2002. The team played this song at home games after Chargers scores and victories until it departed San Diego. From time to time during highlights of NFL PrimeTime, ESPN's Chris Berman and Tom Jackson would briefly sing the first line of the song's chorus.

References

External links

 
 Los Angeles Chargers at the National Football League official website

 
1960 disestablishments in California
1960 establishments in California
2017 establishments in California
American Football League teams
American football teams disestablished in 1960
American football teams established in 1960
American football teams established in 2017
Chargers
American football in Inglewood, California
American football teams in California
Sports teams in Inglewood, California
National Football League teams